Frenchman Lake is a reservoir located in southeastern Plumas County, California. It was created by the damming of Little Last Chance Creek in 1961, as part of the California State Water Project. It was named after its tributary Frenchman Creek, which in turn was named after Claude Francois Seltier, a French immigrant who settled in the area in 1858.

Frenchman Dam 

Frenchman Dam was completed in 1961 as part of the California State Water Project, under the authority of the California Department of Water Resources. It is a rock-fill and earthen dam 129 feet high, with a length of 720 feet at its crest.  Normal water storage in the reservoir is 55,477 acre-feet.

Geography

National Forest Recreation Area
The United States Forest Service administers the Plumas National Forest land surrounding the lake as a National Forest Recreation Area, locally managed as part of the Beckwourth Ranger District.  The Frenchman Lake Recreation Area offers a wide variety of summer outdoor experiences including: camping, picnicking, fishing, hunting, boating, jet skiing, mountain biking, swimming and water-skiing. In the winter, ice fishing, snowmobiling and cross-country skiing are favored activities.

Public campgrounds are located on the south shore at Cottonwood Springs, Frenchman, Spring Creek and Big Cove.  Additionally there is another campground located below the dam along Little Last Chance Creek.

See also
List of dams and reservoirs in California
List of lakes in California

External links

Plumas National Forest
Reservoirs in Plumas County, California
Parks in Plumas County, California
Reservoirs in California
Reservoirs in Northern California
1961 establishments in California